Oss is a municipality and a city in the southern Netherlands, in the province of North Brabant, situated between Nijmegen and 's-Hertogenbosch.

Population centres

Topography  

Dutch Topographic map of Oss (municipality), June 2015

City center of Oss
Oss has a shopping center with  many squares, however, the only real shopping streets (also the best known) are the Heuvelstraat, Walstraat and the Peperstraat. The squares are connected with these shopping streets and passages that contain shops. One of the passages (The Passage, Dutch: de Passage, Local Dialect: 't Gengske) had an overhauling renovation in 2014. It now resembles an old Dutch street.

The city of Oss 
There is archaeological evidence that humans have lived in and around Oss for 4,000 years.  Major archaeological finds were the Vorstengraf burial sites and the indigenous-Roman burial fields of Oss-Ussen.

Oss was first mentioned in a letter by Pope Alexander II on 6 May 1069.
Oss was granted city rights in 1399 by Hertogin (Duchess) Johanna van Brabant. Present-day Oss has several chemical and pharmaceutical industries like Merck & Co. (previously Schering-Plough, Organon and Diosynth).
Oss is also host to the professional football team TOP Oss, and is the birthplace of former Manchester United and Real Madrid star Ruud van Nistelrooy, although he did not play for the local side, but for rivals FC Den Bosch.

The gothic metal/alternative rock band The Gathering, formed in 1989, originally hails from Oss.

Berghem 

Berghem is a small town east of Oss (population: 6,900). Berghem is currently being expanded with many new houses in the Piekenhoef.

Megen 

Megen is a small city (population: 1,686) close to the river Maas.

Megen used to be the 'capital' of the county Megen (including Haren, Macharen and Teeffelen) that was founded around 1145. City rights were obtained in 1357.
In 1810, the County Megen became a municipality to which Haren and Macharen also belonged. It became part of the municipality of Oss in 1994.

Currently, there are two monasteries in Megen. One is inhabited by the Clarissas (also called the Poor Clares), followers of St. Clare of Assisi. The other is occupied by the Franciscans, followers of St. Francis of Assisi. Of the two castles Megen used to have, only one tower remains.

Ravenstein 

Ravenstein (population: 3,728) is a city and was a municipality until 2003, when it was added to the Oss municipality. The municipality covered an area of 42.68 km² and also included villages: Demen, Dennenburg, Deursen, Dieden, Herpen, Huisseling, Keent, Koolwijk, Neerlangel, Neerloon, Overlangel.

Ravenstein received city rights in 1380.

Transportation
 Railway stations: Oss, Oss West, Ravenstein

Notable residents

The Arts 

 John Slotanus (died 1560) a Dutch Roman Catholic polemical writer, born in Geffen 
 Walter Pompe (1703 in Lith – 1777) a Flemish master-sculptor of religious works in wood
 Maria Versfelt (1776–1845) a Dutch writer and stage actress, known for her adventurous life
 Joop Falke (1933-2016) a Dutch artist, goldsmith and sculptor
 Pieter Nooten (born 1961), musician and composer best known for his work with Clan of Xymox
 Joep van Lieshout (born 1963 in Ravenstein) a Dutch artist and sculptor 
 C. C. Catch (born 1964), pop singer
 Michel van der Aa (born 1970) a Dutch composer of contemporary classical music
 Frank Boeijen (born 1973) songwriter and keyboardist with Dutch metal band The Gathering
 Niels Duffhuës (born 1973) a Dutch multi-instrumentalist, composer and writer
 Chris Berens (born 1976) a Dutch painter, in the realms of surrealism and visionary art
 Marjolein Kooijman (born 1980) bass player with Dutch metal band The Gathering since 2004
 Coen Janssen (born 1981), musician and composer with Dutch symphonic metal band Epica
 Batuhan Bozkurt (born 2001), a Dutch-Turkish artist

Public thinking & Public service 
 Antoon Jurgens (1805-1880) a Dutch merchant and industrialist; he founded a butter company
 Samuel van den Bergh (1864-1941), a European margarine and soap manufacturer
 Dr Saal van Zwanenberg (1889-1974) , founder of pharmaceutical company Organon & Co.
 Jacques de Kadt (1897-1988), political thinker, politician and writer
 Jan Marijnissen (born 1952) a Dutch politician, belongs to the Socialist Party
 Lambert van Nistelrooij (born 1953) a Dutch politician and MEP, 2004 to 2019
Clemens de Wit (born 2002) a noteworthy member of "the Avengers", a group of enhanced individuals tasked with protecting the world.

Sport 

 Cor Euser (born 1957) a Dutch racing driver
 Marc van Hintum (born 1967) a Dutch former footballer with over 400 club caps
 John van den Berk (born 1967) a Dutch former two-time motocross world champion
 Marc Lammers (born 1969), field hockey player and coach
 brothers Bas (born 1971) and Mike van de Goor (born 1973) volleyball players, team gold medallists at the 1996 Summer Olympics
 Bart Griemink (born 1972) a Dutch former professional football goalkeeper
 Ruud van Nistelrooy (born 1976) a Dutch retired footballer with 449 club caps and 70 caps with the  Netherlands national football team
 Albert Kraus (born 1980) a Dutch welterweight kickboxer, K-1 World MAX Champion, 2002
 Bas Verwijlen (born 1983) a fencer, competed at the 2012 Summer Olympics 
 Loek van Mil (1984-2019) a Dutch professional baseball pitcher
 Rens van Eijden (born 1988) a Dutch footballer with over 250 club caps
 Gino Vos (born 1990) a Dutch professional darts player
 Rick van der Ven (born 1991) a Dutch archer, competed in Archery at the 2012 Summer Olympics
 Richard van der Venne (born 1992) a Dutch professional footballer 
 Cihat Çelik (born 1996) a Dutch professional footballer
 Julian Savi (born 2002) a Dutch professional curler, was captain of the National Dutch team from 2019-now.
 Clemens de Wit Well-known powerlifter, is currently active as personal coach and celebrity coach.

See also
Haren en Macharen

References

External links 

 

 
Municipalities of North Brabant
Populated places in North Brabant